The following is a list of seasons for the Western International Hockey League. The WIHL was at top tier senior level ice hockey league that operated in North America from 1946 to 1962 and from 1963 to 1988.

WIHL seasons

1946–47 WIHL season
1947–48 WIHL season
1948–49 WIHL season
1949–50 WIHL season
1950–51 WIHL season
1951–52 WIHL season
1952–53 WIHL season
1953–54 WIHL season
1954–55 WIHL season
1955–56 WIHL season
1956–57 WIHL season
1957–58 WIHL season
1958–59 WIHL season
1959–60 WIHL season
1960–61 WIHL season
1961–62 WIHL season
1963–64 WIHL season
1964–65 WIHL season
1965–66 WIHL season
1966–67 WIHL season
1967–68 WIHL season
1968–69 WIHL season
1969–70 WIHL season
1970–71 WIHL season
1971–72 WIHL season
1972–73 WIHL season
1973–74 WIHL season
1974–75 WIHL season
1975–76 WIHL season
1976–77 WIHL season
1977–78 WIHL season
1978–79 WIHL season
1979–80 WIHL season
1980–81 WIHL season
1981–82 WIHL season
1982–83 WIHL season
1983–84 WIHL season
1984–85 WIHL season
1985–86 WIHL season
1986–87 WIHL season
1987–88 WIHL season